Colin Bruce is a British author and physicist. He has written many scientific works, including non-fiction, but he is most well known for his popular science stories. He is an expert in mathematical paradoxes and a lover of mysteries. Living in Oxford, he frequently contributes to university life through giving talks at the Oxford University Physics Society and Oxford University Scientific Society, and attending various events.

Selected works
 The Strange Case of Mrs Hudson's Cat
 Conned Again, Watson: Cautionary Tales of Logic, Math and Probability
 'Schrodinger's Rabbits: The Many Worlds of Quantum''

References

Living people
Year of birth missing (living people)
British physicists
British science writers